Eduard Cristian Zimmermann (born 18 April 1983) is a Romanian professional football player, who plays as a goalkeeper for Liga III club CSM Reșița, which he captains.

Zimmermann started his career at the local team CSM Reșița and was bought by Politehnica Timişoara before the 2003/2004 season.

He is a former Romanian U21 international.

Honours

Petrolul Ploiești
Liga II: 2010–11

CSM Reșița
Liga III: 2018–19, 2021–22

External links

1983 births
Living people
Sportspeople from Reșița
Romanian people of German descent
Romanian footballers
Association football goalkeepers
Liga I players
FC Politehnica Timișoara players
FC Gloria Buzău players
FC Petrolul Ploiești players
Liga II players
Liga III players
CSM Reșița players
LPS HD Clinceni players
FC Drobeta-Turnu Severin players
CS Otopeni players
CS Sportul Snagov players
Romanian expatriate footballers
Expatriate footballers in Germany
Romanian expatriate sportspeople in Germany